Zapatera is a volcano in southern Nicaragua, which forms Zapatera Island in Lake Nicaragua. 

Zapatera may also refer to:
Zapatera (archaeological site)
Zapatera Island
Zapatera Archipelago

See also
Zapatero (disambiguation)